Clubb is an unincorporated community in northeastern Wayne County, Missouri, United States.  It is located at the junction of Missouri Route 34 and Missouri Route C approximately twenty miles southwest of Marble Hill. Greenville is eight miles to the southwest on the St. Francis River. Bear Creek flows past the southeast side of the community.

A post office called Clubb was established in 1892, and remained in operation until 1959. The community has the name of Jake Clubb, who kept a local country store.

References

Unincorporated communities in Wayne County, Missouri
Unincorporated communities in Missouri